The 1998–99 Syracuse Orangemen basketball team represented Syracuse University as a member of the Big East Conference during the 1998–99 NCAA Division I men's basketball season. The head coach was Jim Boeheim, serving for his 23rd year. The team played its home games at the Carrier Dome in Syracuse, New York.  The team finished with a 21–12 (10–8) record, while making it to the NCAA tournament.

The team was led by juniors Ryan Blackwell, Jason Hart, and Etan Thomas.

Roster

Schedule and results

|-
!colspan=9 style=| Regular Season

|-
!colspan=9 style=| Big East Tournament

|-
!colspan=9 style=| NCAA Tournament

Rankings

References

Syracuse Orange
Syracuse Orange men's basketball seasons
Syracuse
Syracuse Orangemen basketball
Syracuse Orangemen basketball